Amrit Pal (born 5 June 1939) is an Indian track and field athlete.

He competed in the 800 metre dash at the 1962 Asian Games and won the bronze medal. Pal also appeared at the 1964 Summer Olympics running the 4 × 400 metres relay and 400 metres hurdles.

References

External links

1939 births
Indian male hurdlers
Athletes (track and field) at the 1964 Summer Olympics
Living people
Indian male middle-distance runners
Medalists at the 1962 Asian Games
Olympic athletes of India
Indian male sprinters
Place of birth missing (living people)
Asian Games medalists in athletics (track and field)
Asian Games silver medalists for India
Asian Games bronze medalists for India
Athletes (track and field) at the 1962 Asian Games
20th-century Indian people